Pseudoseptoria donacis is an ascomycete fungus that is a plant pathogen infecting barley, rye and wheat.

References

External links 
 Index Fungorum
 USDA ARS Fungal Database

Fungal plant pathogens and diseases
Barley diseases
Rye diseases
Wheat diseases
Ascomycota enigmatic taxa